For the sexologist, psychotherapist, and social psychologist, see Gunter Schmidt.

Günter E. W. Schmidt (born 10 May 1926 in Lübeck; died 23 December 2016 in Deutsch Evern) was a German arachnologist and author of a standard German work on tarantulas, Die Vogelspinnen ("bird-eating spiders"). He has been described as one of the fathers of German arachnology.

He studied biology and mostly worked in the pharmaceutical industry until his retirement. In 1975, he graduated with a PhD thesis on the arachnid fauna of the Canary Islands . From 1986, his scientific work was concentrated mainly on tarantulas. The World Spider Catalog lists 234 species names of which he is the author or co-author (not all currently accepted), of which 69 are in the family Theraphosidae (tarantulas).

Books
His books include:
; followed by further editions, including

Species names
Several species names of spiders honour Günter Schmidt, including:
 Haplopelma schmidti von Wirth, 1991 (now Cyriopagopus schmidti)
 Aphonopelma schmidti Smith, 1995 (now a synonym of Aphonopelma chalcodes)
 Cyrtopholis schmidti Rudloff, 1996

References

German arachnologists
1926 births
2016 deaths
20th-century German zoologists